Higgins Block may refer to:

Higgins Block (Lexington, Kentucky), listed on the National Register of Historic Places in Fayette County, Kentucky
Higgins Block (Missoula, Montana), listed on the National Register of Historic Places in Missoula County, Montana